= Languages of the world =

Wikipedia has several articles cataloging the languages of the world in different ways:

== See also ==
- Language
- Category:Lists of languages
